The Northern Ireland Assembly (Elections and Periods of Suspension) Act 2003 (c 12) is an Act of the Parliament of the United Kingdom. The purpose of the Act was to postpone the election of the Northern Ireland Assembly. It was passed because of the suspension of the Northern Ireland Assembly.

Section 6 - Modification of enactments
The following orders were made under section 6(1):
The Northern Ireland Assembly (Elections and Periods of Suspension) Act 2003 (Consequential Modifications) Order 2003 (SI 2003/2696)
The Northern Ireland Assembly (Elections and Periods of Suspension) Act 2003 (Consequential Modifications No. 2) Order 2003 (SI 2003/2752)

References

External links
The Northern Ireland Assembly (Elections and Periods of Suspension) Act 2003, as amended from the National Archives.
The Northern Ireland Assembly (Elections and Periods of Suspension) Act 2003, as originally enacted from the National Archives.
Explanatory notes to the Northern Ireland Assembly (Elections and Periods of Suspension) Act 2003.

United Kingdom Acts of Parliament 2003